Empire Energy was a  cargo ship that was built in 1923 as Grete by Neptun AG, Rostock, Germany. She was sold to an Italian firm in 1932 and renamed Gabbiano. She was seized by the United Kingdom in 1940, passed to the Ministry of War Transport (MoWT) and renamed Empire Energy. She served until 5 November 1941, when she ran aground off Cape Norman, Newfoundland, and was wrecked.

Description
The ship was built in 1923 by Neptun AG, Rostock. 

The engine was built by Neptun AG, Rostock. A low-pressure steam turbine drove a single screw propeller through double-reduction gearing and a hydraulic coupling.

History
Grete was launched in 1923, she was completed in July that year. She was built for C Mohlenberg Reederei GmbH. The Code Letters RDMP were allocated and her port of registry was Hamburg. In 1934, Grete was sold to Achille Lauro & Co, Naples, Italy and was renamed Gabbiano. The Italian Official Number 428 and Code Letters IBOP were allocated. Her port of registry was Naples.

On 10 June 1940, Gabbiano was in port at Liverpool, Lancashire, when Italy declared war against the United Kingdom. Her captain and crew were caught off guard by the boarding party and offered no resistance. They were allowed to collect their belongings before leaving the ship and being interned as enemy aliens.

The ship was seized as a prize of war. She was passed to the MoWT and renamed Empire Energy. The United Kingdom Official Number 167601 and Code Letters GLWY were allocated. She was placed under the management of the E R Management Co Ltd. Her port of registry was London.

Her destination was Durban, South Africa, where she arrived on 8 September. She departed eight days later for Bombay, India, where she arrived on 6 October. Empire Energy departed on 3 November for Durban, arriving on 27 November. She sailed on 13 December for Cape Town, arriving five days later and departing on 20 December for Luanda, Portuguese West Africa, where she arrived on 1 January 1941.

Empire Energy sailed on 12 January for Pointe-Noire, Belgian Congo, arriving that day and sailing immediately for Freetown, Sierra Leone, where she arrived on 23 January. She joined Convoy SL 64S, which departed on 30 January and dispersed at sea on 12 February. She was carrying a cargo of oilseed which was bound for Avonmouth, Somerset, where she arrived on 28 February. She sailed on 8 March for Newport, Monmouthshire, arriving that day. Empire Energy sailed on 23 May for Milford Haven, Pembrokeshire, arriving the next day. Her destination was Reykjavík, Iceland, where she arrived on 2 June. She sailed on 15 June to join Convoy OB 336, which departed from Liverpool that day and dispersed at sea on 25 June. She sailed to Boston, Massachusetts, United States, arriving on 28 June and departing on 10 July for Halifax, Nova Scotia, Canada, where she arrived on 12 July. Empire Energy was a member of Convoy HX 139, which departed on 16 July and arrived at Liverpool on 31 July. She was carrying a cargo of pig iron and scrap iron, and some special cargo, bound for Middlesbrough, Yorkshire, United Kingdom. She put into Reykjavík on 28 July, sailing on 1 August to join Convoy HX 140, which had departed from Halifax on 22 July and arrived at Liverpool on 6 August. She left the convoy at the Clyde, departing on 8 August for Oban, Argyllshire, from where she departed on 9 August as a member of Convoy WN 165, which arrived at Methil, Fife on 11 August. She then joined Convoy FS 566, which departed on 12 August and arrived at Southend, Essex two days later. She arrived at Middlesbrough on 13 August.

Empire Energy departed on 9 September to join Convoy FN 515, which had departed from Southend on 7 September and arrived at Methil on 9 September. She sailed on 13 September to join Convoy EC 72, which had departed from Southend on 11 September and arrived at the Clyde on 16 September. She left the convoy at Loch Ewe on 15 September and sailed to Philadelphia, Pennsylvania, United States, arriving on 10 October. She sailed that day for New York, where she arrived two days later. Empire Energy sailed on 21 October for Sydney, Cape Breton, Nova Scotia, arriving on 20 October. Laden with a cargo of maize, she was a member of Convoy SC 52, which departed on 29 October and returned to Sydney on 5 November after being attacked by U-boats. On 5 November, Empire Energy ran aground at Big Brook, Newfoundland and was wrecked. She was declared a total loss, but there were no casualties amongst her crew.

References

External links
Colour photo of the wreck of Empire Energy in 1959
Colour photo of the wreck of Empire Energy in 2007
Colour photo of the wreck of Empire Energy in 2009

1923 ships
Ships built in Rostock
Steamships of Germany
Merchant ships of Germany
Steamships of Italy
Merchant ships of Italy
Empire ships
Ministry of War Transport ships
Steamships of the United Kingdom
Maritime incidents in November 1941